Nilaji is a village in Belgaum district of Karnataka, India. It is located in Raibag taluk.

Demographics 
As of the 2011 Census of India, Nilaji has a total population of 6,904, with 3,552 males, 3,352 females and 1,177 households. The Scheduled Castes and Scheduled Tribes comprise 2,203 and 47 of the population.

References

Villages in Belagavi district